Verena Bentele (born 28 February 1982, in Lindau) is a blind German Paralympic biathlete and cross-country skier. She studied at the Carl-Strehl Schule, a special school for the blind and partially sighted in Marburg, Germany. She won her first Paralympic medals (one gold, two silver, one bronze) at the 1998 Winter Paralympics, followed by four gold medals at the 2002 Winter Paralympics, as well as two gold and one bronze medal at the 2006 Winter Paralympics
She was also winner of the Combined World Cup in Biathlon und Cross-Country in 2006.

Career
During the 2009 German blind cross country championship, Bentele had a serious accident. Her sighted guide failed to give proper directions, so she fell down a slope in a dry river bed. She tore a cruciate ligament in her knee, and suffered finger and liver injuries, and damaged one kidney so badly that it had to be removed.

Despite this, only a year later, Bentele had her best Olympic result, winning five gold medals in the 2010 Winter Paralympics in Vancouver. As a result of her performance at the Games, Bentele was named Best Female at the Paralympic Sport Awards.

Bentele has won the "Laureus World Sportsperson of the Year with a Disability" award for the year 2011. Late in 2011, she announced her retirement at the age of 29. In 2014 Bentele was inducted into the Paralympic Hall of Fame.

Bentele was nominated by the Social Democratic Party to be a delegate to the Federal Convention for the purpose of electing the President of Germany in 2010, 2012 and 2017. She joined the party in 2012.

Federal Government Commissioner for Matters relating to Disabled Persons, 2014–2018
In January 2014, Bentele was appointed Federal Government Commissioner for Matters relating to Disabled Persons in the government of Chancellor Angela Merkel. In this capacity, she was part of the Federal Ministry of Labour and Social Affairs under the leadership of minister Andrea Nahles and heads the government's focal point in charge of monitoring the implementation of the Convention on the Rights of Persons with Disabilities. She served in that position until 2018.

Other activities
 German Sport University Cologne (DSHS), Member of the University Council
 German Institute for Human Rights (DIMR), Ex-Officio Member of the Board of Trustees
 National Paralympic Committee Germany (DBS), Member of the Board of Trustees (since 2012)

References

External links 
 
 
  
  

1982 births
Living people
German female biathletes
German female cross-country skiers
Paralympic biathletes of Germany
Paralympic cross-country skiers of Germany
Paralympic medalists in biathlon
Paralympic medalists in cross-country skiing
Paralympic gold medalists for Germany
Paralympic silver medalists for Germany
Paralympic bronze medalists for Germany
Visually impaired category Paralympic competitors
Biathletes at the 1998 Winter Paralympics
Biathletes at the 2002 Winter Paralympics
Biathletes at the 2006 Winter Paralympics
Biathletes at the 2010 Winter Paralympics
Cross-country skiers at the 1998 Winter Paralympics
Cross-country skiers at the 2002 Winter Paralympics
Cross-country skiers at the 2006 Winter Paralympics
Cross-country skiers at the 2010 Winter Paralympics
Medalists at the 1998 Winter Paralympics
Medalists at the 2002 Winter Paralympics
Medalists at the 2006 Winter Paralympics
Medalists at the 2010 Winter Paralympics
Laureus World Sports Awards winners
Paralympic Sport Awards — Best Female winners
Recipients of the Order of Merit of Baden-Württemberg
Recipients of the Silver Laurel Leaf
People from Lindau
Sportspeople from Swabia (Bavaria)
German blind people